Obelisk Col is a col at about 150 m on the east side of Cape Obelisk, James Ross Island, aligned north-south between Rum Cove and Rohss Bay. Named after Cape Obelisk by the United Kingdom Antarctic Place-Names Committee (UK-APC) in 1983.

References

Mountain passes of Graham Land
Landforms of James Ross Island